Niagara Centre (renamed to Welland from 2006 to 2018) is a provincial electoral district in Ontario, Canada, represented from 1867 until 1977 and again since 2007 (under different boundaries) in the Legislative Assembly of Ontario. Its population in 2006 was 112,875.

A new riding of Niagara Centre was created before the 1999 election from small parts of the Lincoln and St. Catharines—Brock ridings, and almost all of the Welland—Thorold riding. The current electoral district was created in 2003: 74.9% of the riding came from Niagara Centre riding, 22.5% from Erie—Lincoln and 2.7% from Niagara Falls riding. The name was changed to Welland during redistricting in 2006. In 2018, the name was changed back to Niagara Centre.

Geography

The pre-2018 Welland riding consisted of the cities of Welland, Thorold, Port Colborne, and the part of the City of St. Catharines lying south of a line drawn from the western city limit east along St. Paul Street West, northeast along St. Paul Crescent, east and south along Twelve Mile Creek, and east along Glendale Avenue to the eastern city limit.

Members of Provincial Parliament

Source: Legislative Assembly of Ontario

Election results

Niagara Centre, 2018–

Welland, 2007–2018

Niagara Centre, 1999–2007

2007 electoral reform referendum

References

External links
 Map of riding for 2018 election
 Map of riding boundaries

Ontario provincial electoral districts
Politics of St. Catharines
Port Colborne
Thorold
Welland